WPLG (channel 10) is a television station in Miami, Florida, United States, affiliated with ABC. The station is owned by Berkshire Hathaway as its sole broadcast property. WPLG's studios are located on West Hallandale Beach Boulevard in Pembroke Park, and its transmitter is located in Miami Gardens, Florida.

WPLG signed on the air as WLBW-TV on November 20, 1961, as the replacement for WPST-TV, which was forced off the air by the Federal Communications Commission (FCC) following the revelation of bribery undertaken with one of the commissioners to secure that station's license. L. B. Wilson, Inc., was found to be the only bidder for the original channel 10 license not to have engaged in coercive action, and was thus awarded a temporary permit to begin telecasting. While WPST-TV's license was revoked in July 1960, WLBW-TV had to wait for nearly a year to finally sign on using entirely different facilities, but hired multiple former WPST-TV staffers and picked up the ABC affiliation WPST-TV held. Sold to Post-Newsweek Stations in 1969, WLBW-TV was renamed WPLG the following year in honor of Philip Leslie Graham. Led by on-air talent including Ann Bishop, Dwight Lauderdale, Bryan Norcross, Michael Putney and Calvin Hughes, WPLG's news department emerged in the 1970s as a leader in local television ratings and has maintained that position ever since. WPLG has been owned by Berkshire Hathaway since 2014, when Post-Newsweek (renamed Graham Media Group) divested it, but continues to maintain infrastructure and logistical ties to its previous ownership.

Prior history of channel 10

The first station to broadcast on channel 10 in the Miami market was WPST-TV, owned by Public Service Television, the broadcasting subsidiary of National Airlines (NAL). WPST-TV was the second ABC affiliate in the Miami market, having assumed it from UHF station WITV. WPST-TV first signed on the air on August 2, 1957, from a transmitter tower and facilities purchased from Storer Broadcasting when their UHF outlet, WGBS-TV, was taken dark. A gala grand opening celebration for a purpose-built studio facility on Biscayne Boulevard took place on January 17, 1958. The same day, Drew Pearson's syndicated newspaper column alleged unethical behavior among FCC commissioner Richard A. Mack and Miami attorney Thurman A. Whiteside, working on behalf of National Airlines, who bribed the commissioner to help obtain the broadcast license.

Investigations by the House Subcommittee on Legislative Oversight and an rehearing on the WPST-TV license award by retired judge Horace Stern revealed a pattern of influencing behavior among three of the four bidders for the license, as well as lobbyists and legislators aligned with the bidders after learning of Mack's vote. Mack resigned his position and was later arrested with Whiteside on three counts of influence peddling, fraud and conspiracy. Stern, who was acting as an independent examiner on the FCC's behalf, recommended on December 1, 1958, that WPST-TV's license be revoked. The FCC agreed on July 14, 1960, revoking the license and awarding a temporary four-month operating permit to Cincinnati-area broadcaster L. B. Wilson, Inc., the only bidder for the license not to be implicated in the scandal, effective immediately on WPST-TV's closure.

L. B. Wilson, Inc. had been one of the four applicants for the channel in 1953. Owner of radio station WCKY in Cincinnati, its namesake was L. B. Wilson of that city, who wintered in Miami Beach. He died of a heart attack on October 28, 1954, in a Cincinnati hotel suite; this was credited with weakening the credibility of his business's application. Wilson's will split his stake in the business. One half went to his widow, Constance, and was voted on by three executives: Charles H. Topmiller, who had worked for Wilson for 24 years; Jeannette Heinze, Wilson's secretary of 23 years; and Thomas A. Welstead, manager of WCKY's office in New York City. The other went to Wilson's brother, Hansford; the three executives and another employee; and three friends, one of whom was Sol Taishoff, the publisher of Broadcasting magazine.

History

A new channel 10

As the temporary license granted to L. B. Wilson, Inc. was basically a "license by default", replacement station WLBW-TV was quickly assembled by company president Charles Topmiller, who took over for the company's namesake upon his 1954 death (and which the call sign was selected in tribute). Separate studio facilities and transmitter towers needed to be secured due to NAL founder/CEO George T. Baker refusing to sell any of WPST-TV's assets, valuing the studio building at more than five times the market value. WPST-TV was originally given a date of September 15, 1960, to vacate the airwaves and allow for WLBW-TV to take to the air, but a series of appeals filed by Baker delayed the process substantially, with the FCC temporarily suspending the order. WLBW-TV was given authority to transmit a test pattern during the overnight hours, doing so starting in November 1960, operating on a standby basis employing a minimum of staffers.

After Baker exhausted his appeals with the U.S. Supreme Court denying a writ of certiorari to Judge E. Barrett Prettyman's ruling affirming the FCC's revoking order on October 9, 1961, the commission imposed a new deadline of 3:00 a.m. on November 20, 1961. WPST-TV's last day of operations on November 19 featured an on-air editorial delivered by Baker decrying the FCC's verdict and rejected the allegations levied against the station. Baker's editorial was reprinted in newspapers the very next day alongside a "statement of policy" advertisement taken out by WLBW-TV. The marquee outside the former WPST-TV studios continued to be turned on every night for nearly 18 months after closure as a sign of defiance by Baker, only turning it off after agreeing to sell the building. The former WPST-TV transmitter site was repurchased by Storer and later reused for WAJA-TV. Despite this severe license discontinuity and little connection between the two other than the ABC affiliation, what is now WPLG claims the National Airlines station's history as its own.

The first program to be seen on the new WLBW-TV was a short dedication led by Topmiller and short talks by a priest, a rabbi, and a minister. The studio facilities proved cramped from the start: in reviewing the first day of activities, which included a debate among Miami mayoral candidates, news and kids' shows, The Miami News television critic Kristine Dunn noted that WLBW-TV already needed "more studio space, more storage space and more office space". Some of the faces seen on WPST-TV moved to the new station, including Bill Bayer (whose public affairs program Important became Miami Press Conference after the change). Molly Turner, who had previously hosted a mid-morning interview show on WPST-TV, was hired by WLBW-TV to host a daily variety show modeled after The 50/50 Club with Ruth Lyons, a popular program in Cincinnati. It was also the first station in Miami to feature a weather girl, Virginia Booker.

However, with an initial operating authority to run for four months, L. B. Wilson, Inc., had to fend off competitors nearly immediately. In February 1962, the FCC opened the door to competing applications against Wilson's bid for a full-term license for WLBW-TV. In addition to Wilson, former WPST-TV owner Public Service Television applied (only to have its bid deemed unacceptable for filing), as did a group of former WPST-TV employees organized as the South Florida Television Corporation; Civic Television, headed by Charles Crandon; and the Miami Television Company, whose stakeholders included a string of local civic leaders. FCC hearing examiner H. Gifford Irion gave the nod to South Florida Television in his initial decision, issued at the end of 1963, because of its experience and civic participation; but in July 1964, the full FCC opted to set aside the examiner's choice and awarded a full-term license to Wilson on a 4–1 vote.

With its long-term prospects more secure, WLBW-TV began to plan for the future. In 1964, it began airing local color programming from film and tape. In 1965, the station acquired a parcel of land at Biscayne Boulevard and NE 39th Street to construct a purpose-built, color-equipped facility with two studios. Construction began that fall, and the studio formally opened in March 1967, allowing the station to broadcast local programs, including the dance show Saturday Hop, in color. The station became known as "Colorvision 10".

Post-Newsweek ownership
In March 1969, L. B. Wilson, Inc., announced the $20 million sale of WLBW-TV and WCKY radio—which it had owned for 40 years—by the Washington Post Company for $20 million. It was the first broadcasting purchase for the Post since acquiring WJXT in Jacksonville in 1953. The FCC approved in September 1969, and one of the Wilson ownership's last acts was to deliver $250,000 in bonus checks to WLBW and WCKY employees with a year or more of tenure. News of Post-Newsweek's first changes came at the very end of the year. On March 16, 1970, the station's call letters were changed to the current WPLG—the calls were chosen in honor of Philip L. Graham, husband of Washington Post publisher Katharine Graham, who committed suicide in 1963. Similarly to L. B. Wilson, Graham also had local ties to the area: the oldest son of Ernest R. Graham, he had been a longtime resident of Miami and was the brother to eventual Florida senator Bob Graham.

WPLG adopted its current "10" logo, which features four stripes of differing colors within the "0" that represent a sunset, in 1982.

On January 1, 1989, the Miami–Fort Lauderdale market underwent a three-way network affiliation swap that saw longtime CBS affiliate WTVJ (channel 4) becoming an NBC owned-and-operated station; longtime independent station and charter Fox affiliate, WCIX (channel 6) becoming a CBS owned-and-operated station; and longtime NBC affiliate WSVN (channel 7) taking the Fox affiliation from WCIX. WTVJ and WCIX later swapped channel positions on September 10, 1995, as compensation for an affiliation deal involving Group W, with WCIX moving to channel 4 as WFOR-TV and WTVJ moving to channel 6. Neither transaction affected WPLG, which retained its ABC affiliation as well as its channel 10 allocation. As a result, it is the only television station in the Miami–Fort Lauderdale market that has retained the same network affiliation throughout its history. Possibly because of this consistency, WPLG remains one of the highest-rated stations in South Florida. In 2004, WPLG began branding itself as "Local 10" under the branding standardization adopted by Post-Newsweek for its stations.

From April 2007 to May 2009, WPLG was South Florida's most-watched English-language television station according to Nielsen; this can partially be attributed to its availability on Comcast's West Palm Beach system, which in turn had a potentially negative effect on the ratings for that market's ABC affiliate, WPBF. However, Comcast dropped WPLG from its West Palm Beach area systems on April 13, 2011. After the May 2009 ratings period, the station switched to a single anchor format for its evening newscasts; WPLG's total-day viewership fell behind CBS-owned WFOR, which took the #1 position among the market's English-language stations. However, WPLG remains tied with WSVN for second/third.

On July 18, 2008, Post-Newsweek Stations announced that it would purchase WTVJ for $205 million. The purchase would have created a duopoly between WTVJ and WPLG—duopolies involving two "Big Three" stations ordinarily would be prohibited under the FCC's media ownership rules, which do not allow duopolies involving two of a market's four highest-rated stations in terms of audience share; however during the May 2008 Nielsen ratings period, WPLG ranked in first place and WTVJ ranked sixth in total-day viewership, allowing the possibility of a purchase. Under the proposal, WTVJ would have merged its operations with WPLG at the studio facility (which was under construction at the time) on Hallandale Beach Boulevard in Pembroke Park. However, the sale was cancelled on December 23, 2008, with NBC Universal and The Washington Post Company citing poor economic conditions and the lack of approval by the FCC.

On March 28, 2009, WPLG relocated its studio facilities from 3900 Biscayne Boulevard to the new Pembroke Park facility. As a result of this relocation, all of the South Florida market's "Big Three" network stations are based outside of the Miami city limits.

Sale to Berkshire Hathaway
In 2013, the Washington Post Company sold the Washington Post to Amazon founder and chairman Jeff Bezos; the company retained most of the other non-newspaper assets, including the Post-Newsweek broadcast outlets, and renamed itself Graham Holdings.

On March 12, 2014, Graham Holdings announced that it would sell WPLG to the BH Media subsidiary of Berkshire Hathaway in a cash and stock deal. Berkshire Hathaway and its chairman, Warren Buffett, had been longtime stockholders in Graham Holdings; the sale of WPLG included a large majority of Berkshire Hathaway's shares in Graham Holdings. To maintain continuity following the consummation of the purchase, BH Media entered into agreements with Post-Newsweek Stations (renamed Graham Media Group in July 2014) to continue providing the station with access to its centralized digital media, design, and traffic services after the sale's completion. The sale was finalized on June 30.

Programming

Syndicated programming
Syndicated programming seen on WPLG as of September 2022 includes Wheel of Fortune, Jeopardy!, and Live with Kelly and Ryan.

Tape-delayed programming
WPLG carries the entire ABC programming schedule, including the ABC station-exclusive Saturday morning syndicated block Weekend Adventure. However, until the network dropped the program on August 28, 2010 (following Saban Entertainment's repurchase of the franchise from ABC's corporate parent The Walt Disney Company), the station ran the ABC Kids airings of Power Rangers on a week-delayed basis, airing it on Saturdays from 5:00 to 6:00 a.m. due to the station's three-hour weekend morning newscast (which at the time had aired from 7:00 to 10:00 a.m.). Around the same time, it also aired the 9:00–10:00 a.m. hour of the ABC Kids block from 12:00 to 1:00 p.m. (then ABC's recommended timeslot to air Power Rangers). The latter scheduling continues in use even after the network replaced ABC Kids with Weekend Adventure in September 3, 2011.

Dr. Phil on WPLG
In 2004, WPLG announced it had won a bidding war to air Dr. Phil and Judge Judy starting in 2006. However, the station had a contractual stipulation not to air Dr. Phil in direct competition with The Oprah Winfrey Show, also produced by Harpo Productions. WPLG's only option was to cancel its 5 p.m. newscast, forgoing its time slot to Dr. Phil, preceded by Judge Judy at 4 p.m. This became the station's final decision.

Initially slow out of the gate, the change ended up being successful as WPLG ranked No. 1 in the 5 p.m. time slot, beating out its competitors' 5 p.m. newscasts, and was able to lure viewers into its 6 p.m. newscast. This change was so successful that other local stations in the Miami and West Palm Beach markets started airing syndicated programming in place of local newscasts, such as WPTV, WTVJ, and WPBF. But by 2011, Dr. Phils ratings had slipped and WPLG announced that the show would move back to WFOR, replacing Oprah which had just ended its 25-year run.

Sports programming
WPLG airs contests involving the NBA's Miami Heat via the network's contract with the league. The station has aired the Heat's 2006, 2011–14, and 2020 NBA Finals appearances, including the team's 2006, 2012 and 2013 championship victories.

The station also airs select Miami Hurricanes football games as part of ABC's rights to college football telecasts. This included the team's national championship in 2001 by winning the 2002 Rose Bowl.

WPLG also broadcasts select Florida Panthers contests beginning in 2021 through ABC's contract with the NHL. Since 2022, the station has also aired the Miami Grand Prix using a simulcast of Sky Sports F1.

News operation

WPLG presently broadcasts 54½ hours of locally produced newscasts each week (with 8½ hours each weekday and six hours each on Saturdays and Sundays) – the highest of any ABC affiliate in the nation – and produces an additional 16 hours of local newscasts for Scripps-owned CW affiliate WSFL-TV each week (with three hours each weekday and 30 minutes each on Saturdays and Sundays). In regards to the number of hours devoted to news programming, as of June 2021, it is the highest local newscast output of any station in the Miami market (with a combined 70½ hours each week) after surpassing Fox affiliate WSVN (which runs 63½ hours of newscasts each week). In addition, the station produces the hour-long political discussion program This Week in South Florida, which debuted in 1990 and airs Sunday mornings at 11:30 a.m.. From the show's inception until his retirement on December 18, 2022, the program was hosted by senior political reporter Michael Putney. Glenna Milberg, who has co-moderated the show since 2014, became the sole leader of the program upon Putney's retirement.

In 1979, WPLG deployed the first helicopter in the Miami market used for newsgathering, known as "Sky 10". The station became well known from 1976 to 1982 for its popular anchor team of Glenn Rinker, Ann Bishop, sports anchor Chuck Dowdle and meteorologist Walter Cronise. In 1982, the station adopted the Eyewitness News format for its newscasts, which was used until its news branding was changed to the generic Channel 10 News in 2001; that year, Rinker left for another position in Orlando and was replaced as evening co-anchor by Mike Schneider. Schneider and Bishop remained paired as the station's lead anchor team until 1986, when Schneider left to become the 5:30 and 11:00 p.m. co-anchor at CBS flagship station WCBS-TV in New York City and was replaced by general assignment reporter Dwight Lauderdale (who had been working at WPLG since 1976); Lauderdale's appointment as anchor made him the first African-American to anchor a nightly newscast in the South Florida market, and he remained the station's primary evening co-anchor until his retirement in 2008.

By 1985, WPLG had surpassed rival WTVJ (channel 4, now on channel 6) in the ratings and would dominate the ratings for over ten years. Ann Bishop would continue to serve as co-anchor for the station's evening newscasts until 1995, when she moved to a part-time position at the station until she died from colon cancer in 1997. Don Noe joined WPLG in 1979 and was one of Miami's most popular chief meteorologists (Walter Cronise having moved to the morning newscasts) up until his retirement in 2007; Chuck Dowdle, meanwhile, had left by 1986 for fellow ABC station WSB-TV in Atlanta; his slot was filled by Khambrel Marshall, who later moved to WFOR and then to WPLG's former sister station in Houston, KPRC. Since 1993, WPLG has used several versions of Gari Media Group's "The One and Only" news music package, which took its name from a longtime slogan originally used by the station from 1979 to 1999 and was revived in 2014.

On March 28, 2009, in conjunction with the station's relocation to its Pembroke Park studios, WPLG became the third Miami station to begin broadcasting its local newscasts in high definition. On August 22, 2011, WPLG debuted an hour-long newscast at 5:00 p.m., which replaced Dr. Phil after it moved back to WFOR-TV; the station had produced an early evening newscast in that timeslot previously until it was replaced by Dr. Phil in 2004. On January 13, 2014, WPLG added an hour-long newscast at 4:00 p.m. weekdays, which competes against an existing hour-long newscast in that slot on WSVN. On April 27, 2014, WPLG expanded This Week in South Florida to one hour, retaining its 11:30 a.m. timeslot on Sundays. On August 13, 2018, WPLG added a half-hour 3 p.m. weekday newscast and later in fall, it expands to full hour.

On March 10, 2021, it was announced that WPLG will start producing newscasts for WSFL-TV, allowing the latter to restore news content in some form to the station after cancelling in-house newscasts in September 2018. Began on June 1, 2021, under the Local 10 branding, WPLG airs a 2-hour extension of their weekday newscast from 7 to 9 a.m, and a nightly 10 p.m. newscast on WSFL.

Notable current on-air staff

 Calvin Hughes – anchor
 Max Mayfield – Hurricane Specialist
 Will Manso – sports director; also heard during coverage of University of Miami football on WQAM (560 AM)
 Michael Putney – senior political reporter; also host of This Week in South Florida

Notable former on-air staff

 Ernie Anderson – station announcer
 Morry Alter – host of The Morry Story (1980s)
 Jack Barry – host of local game show Hole in One in 1962 (later hosted The Joker's Wild; deceased)
 Ann Bishop (1970–1995; deceased)
 Susan Candiotti (now a national correspondent for CNN)
 Jimmy Cefalo – sports anchor (now a radio show host and Radio Play by Play Voice of the Miami Dolphins)
 Liz Cho (now at WABC-TV in New York City)
 Bertha Coombs (now with CNBC)
 Victoria Corderi (now with NBC News)
 Roy Firestone (later with ESPN)
 Megan Glaros (most recently at WBBM-TV in Chicago until 2020)
 Carlos Granda (now at KABC-TV in Los Angeles)
 Larry King
 Steve Kroft (1977–1980; retired correspondent for CBS News' 60 Minutes)
 Dwight Lauderdale (1976–2008; now retired)
 Bryan Norcross – Hurricane Specialist (1983–1990 and 2018–2022; now with Fox Weather)
 Charles Perez
 Walter Perez – reporter (now at WPVI-TV in Philadelphia)
 Rob Schmitt (now at Newsmax)
 Richard Schlesinger (now at CBS News)
 Mike Schneider – 6 and 11 p.m. anchor (now with NJ PBS as anchor and managing editor of NJ Today)
 Jon Scott – anchor (1983–1988; now anchor at Fox News Channel)
 Molly Turner
 Lisa Willis – reporter, fill-in anchor, 2001. Now retired from TV.

Technical information

Subchannels
The station's digital signal is multiplexed:

WPLG previously carried LATV on its second digital subchannel; the Spanish language network was replaced by MeTV on April 24, 2012. On January 24, 2013, Post-Newsweek Stations entered into an affiliation agreement to carry the Live Well Network on digital subchannels of WPLG and its then-Orlando sister station WKMG-TV; both stations added the network in April 2013.

Analog-to-digital conversion
WPLG ended programming on its analog signal, on VHF channel 10, on June 12, 2009, the official date in which full-power television stations in the United States transitioned from analog to digital broadcasts under federal mandate. The station's digital signal relocated from its pre-transition VHF channel 9 to channel 10 for post-transition operations. Three other local stations (WSVN, WPXM-TV and WLTV-DT) also moved their digital signals to their former analog channel allocation, requiring viewers to rescan their digital tuners. WPLG and WSVN are the only Miami stations that continue to broadcast on the VHF band.

Out of market coverage 
WPLG is one of four Miami-based TV stations that are viewed via cable in The Bahamas.

Notes

References

External links

MeTVMiami.com – MeTV Miami official website

PLG
ABC network affiliates
MeTV affiliates
Heroes & Icons affiliates
Berkshire Hathaway
Television channels and stations established in 1961
2014 mergers and acquisitions
1961 establishments in Florida